

The Kinetic Mountain Goat is an American two-seat cabin monoplane, designed by Bill Montagne for his company Kinetic Aviation.

Design and development
The Mountain Goat is a high-wing braced monoplane with a fixed conventional landing gear with a tailwheel. Powered by a  Lycoming IO-360-B2E flat-four piston engine with a Kinetic-designed two-bladed tractor propeller. The enclosed cabin has two seats in tandem with dual controls, each side has a one-piece Plexiglas door for access.

Specification

References

Notes

Bibliography

1990s United States civil utility aircraft